Jérôme Déom (born 19 April 1999) is a Belgian professional footballer who plays as a midfielder for Eupen.

Club career
Déom is a youth exponent from Standard Liège. On 7 May 2016, he made his Belgian Pro League debut against Waasland-Beveren.

On 13 July 2021, he signed a three-year contract with Eupen.

References

External links
 
 

1999 births
Living people
Association football midfielders
Belgian footballers
Belgium youth international footballers
Standard Liège players
MVV Maastricht players
K.A.S. Eupen players
Belgian Pro League players
Eerste Divisie players
People from Libramont-Chevigny
Belgian expatriate footballers
Expatriate footballers in the Netherlands
Belgian expatriate sportspeople in the Netherlands
Footballers from Luxembourg (Belgium)